The Graystone Lodge, also known as Hoskins-Guidice House, is a historic structure located at Bel Air, Harford County, Maryland, United States. It is a two-story stone building built about 1781, with a mid-19th century frame addition. The house is a representative example of a pre-Civil War coachbuilder's shop, which embodies the distinctive characteristics of high-quality Quaker craftsmanship in its stone structure.

The Graystone Lodge was listed on the National Register of Historic Places in 2007.

References

External links
, Maryland Historical Trust

Houses in Bel Air, Harford County, Maryland
Houses on the National Register of Historic Places in Maryland
Houses completed in the 18th century
National Register of Historic Places in Harford County, Maryland